This is a listing of all those that have served as the Mayor of the municipality of Águas de São Pedro in the Brazilian state of São Paulo.

See also

 Mayors in Brazil

References and notes

Footnotes

Citations

External links
  Prefeitura de Águas de São Pedro The official website of Águas de São Pedro.
  Câmara de Vereadores de Águas de São Pedro Águas de São Pedro Municipal Council website.



Aguas de São Pedro